The Afar gecko (Hemidactylus afarensis) is a species of house gecko from Ethiopia and Eritrea.

References

Hemidactylus
Reptiles described in 2020